CD200 receptor 1 like is a protein that in humans is encoded by the CD200R1L gene.

References

Further reading